Thomas Antony Olajide, sometimes also credited as Thomas Olajide, is a Canadian actor from Vancouver, British Columbia. He is most noted for his performance in the 2021 film Learn to Swim, for which he received a Canadian Screen Award nomination for Best Actor at the 10th Canadian Screen Awards in 2022, and as co-creator with Tawiah M'carthy and Stephen Jackman-Torkoff of Black Boys, a theatrical show about Black Canadian LGBTQ+ identities which was staged by Buddies in Bad Times in 2016. Olajide, M'carthy, and Jackman-Torkoff were collectively nominated for Outstanding Ensemble Performance at the Dora Mavor Moore Awards in 2017.

His other stage roles have included productions of William Shakespeare's The Winter's Tale for The Dream in High Park; King Lear, A Midsummer Night's Dream and Love's Labour's Lost for the Stratford Festival; Lynn Nottage's Ruined for Canadian Stage; and Michel Nadeau's And Slowly Beauty for the Belfry Theatre and the National Arts Centre.

In film he also starred in the short film Mariner and the feature film White Lie. In television he had regular roles in the web series Inhuman Condition and Nomades, and received a Prix Gémeaux nomination for Best Actor in a Youth Digital Series in 2020 for Nomades. In 2023 he is slated to have a regular supporting role in the television series The Spencer Sisters as police officer Zane Graham.

He is a graduate of the National Theatre School of Canada, and of the Actors Conservatory at the Canadian Film Centre.

References

External links

21st-century Canadian male actors
21st-century Canadian dramatists and playwrights
21st-century Canadian male writers
Canadian male film actors
Canadian male stage actors
Canadian male television actors
Canadian male Shakespearean actors
Canadian male dramatists and playwrights
Black Canadian male actors
Male actors from Vancouver
Canadian Film Centre alumni
National Theatre School of Canada alumni
LGBT male actors
Canadian LGBT actors
Canadian LGBT dramatists and playwrights
Black Canadian LGBT people
Living people
Year of birth missing (living people)
Queer actors
Queer dramatists and playwrights
21st-century Canadian LGBT people